Alva Winfred Wilfong (March 18, 1933 – May 18, 1985) was an American professional basketball player.

A 6'2" guard/forward from the University of Missouri and the University of Memphis, Wilfong played four seasons (1957–1961) in the National Basketball Association as a member of the St. Louis Hawks and Cincinnati Royals.  He averaged 6.8 points per game and won a league championship with St. Louis in 1958.

External links

1933 births
1985 deaths
American men's basketball players
Basketball players at the 1955 Pan American Games
Basketball players from Missouri
Cincinnati Royals players
Kansas City Steers players
Memphis Tigers men's basketball players
Missouri Tigers men's basketball players
Pan American Games gold medalists for the United States
Pan American Games medalists in basketball
People from Stoddard County, Missouri
Shooting guards
Small forwards
St. Louis Hawks draft picks
St. Louis Hawks players
Medalists at the 1955 Pan American Games